Alissa Walser (born 1961) is a German writer, translator, and artist. She was born in Friedrichshafen on Lake Constance. Her father is the German writer Martin Walser. She is known for her short stories, plays, novels, and translations. Many of her stories include drawings which seem to interrupt them but instead continue the narrative on a different level. She has won a number of German literary prizes.

Life 
From 1981 to 1986 Alissa Walser studied painting in Vienna and New York City. After 1990 she began publishing translations and fiction. She lives in Frankfurt/Main (Germany) and is married to Sascha Anderson.

Works available in English 
Mesmerized, her first novel (Am Anfang war die Nacht Musik, 2010), has been translated into English by Jamie Bulloch. It retells the encounter of the blind eighteenth-century pianist and composer Maria Theresia Paradis and the healing attempt by the scandalous doctor Franz Anton Mesmer. The original book cover for the German edition is based on a drawing by Walser of a glass harmonica, an eighteenth-century musical instrument. Barbara Albert directed a film adaptation under the title  Mademoiselle Paradis (Licht, 2017).

Painting in a Man's World: Four Stories about Berthe Morisot, Mary Cassatt, Eva Gonzalès, Marie Bracquemond by Diane Broeckhoven, Noëlle Châtelet, Annette Pehnt, Alissa Walser. Hatje Cantz, 2008. 

Several stories appeared in English translation in journals such as Open City (vol. 8, 2000) and Grand Street.

Translations into German (Sselection)

Prose and poetry
 Diane Glancy: Kriegstanz. Frankfurt 1995.
 Sylvia Plath: Max Nix. Frankfurt 1996.
 Sylvia Plath: Die Tagebücher. Frankfurt 1997.
 Kay Boyle: Das kleine Kamel. Frankfurt 1998.
 Robert Barry: Ein kleines Stück vom Glück. Frankfurt 1999.
 Anne Carson: Glas, Ironie und Gott. München 2000.
 Paula Fox: Louisa. München 2005.
 Sylvia Plath: Ariel. English and German. Frankfurt 2008.
 Mary Miller: Süßer König Jesus. Berlin 2013.
 Elizabeth Harrower: In gewissen Kreisen. Berlin 2016.
 Mary Miller: Big World. Storys. München 2017.
 Elizabeth Harrower: Die Träume der anderen. Berlin 2019.
 Margaret Atwood: Die Füchsin: Gedichte 1965-1995. Berlin Verlag, Berlin 2020. Kindle and ISBN 978-3827013866

Theater plays
 Joyce Carol Oates: Ontologischer Beweis meines Daseins. Frankfurt a. M. 1985.
 Joyce Carol Oates: Tone clusters. Reinbek 1990.
 Joyce Carol Oates: Nackt steh ich vor euch. Reinbek 1990.
 Brock Norman Brock: Da ist Monster. Reinbek 1991.
 Joyce Carol Oates: Die Mondfinsternis. Reinbek 1991.
 Janusz Głowacki: Antigone in New York. 1994.
 Jon Robin Baitz: Vom wahren Feuer. Reinbek 1995.
 Marsha Norman: Nacht, Mutter. Reinbek 2002.
 Christopher Hampton: Die Methode. Reinbek 2003.
 Several plays by Edward Albee (together with Martin Walser).

Exhibits (selection) and art works  

 Sprachlaub oder: Wahr ist, was schön ist. Texts by Martin Walser, water colors by Alissa Walser. Rowohlt, 2021. ISBN 978-3498002398 (German Edition)
 The small work show, BACA Downton, NY, 1984
 Small work, big ideas, PAN Art Gallery, NY, 1985
 The new show, Chameleon Gallery, Brooklyn, NY, 1986
 Kunstlichtgalerie, Konstanz, 1998
 Dichtung und Wahrheit, Arte Giani, Frankfurt a. M., 1999
 Kunstraum Brüssel, Belgien, 2001
 Städtische Galerie Backnang, 2001
 Text und Bild, Städtische Wessenberg-Galerie Konstanz, 2001
 Arte Giani, Frankfurt a. M., 2002
 Deutsche Structured Finance, Frankfurt a. M., 2004
 Städtische Wessenberg-Galerie Konstanz, 2005
 Galerie Buchhandlung Lesezeichen, Dresden, 2006
 Galerie Brandstätter, Baden-Baden, 2006
 Galerie Pabst, München, 2007
 Literaturhaus Stuttgart, 2007

Awards (selection) 
 1992: Ingeborg Bachmann Prize
 2009: Paul Scheerbart Prize (Heinrich Maria Ledig-Rowohlt Foundation) for the translation of poems by Sylvia Plath

References

1961 births
Living people
People from Friedrichshafen
German women short story writers
Writers from Baden-Württemberg
German women novelists
20th-century German women writers
21st-century German women writers
21st-century German novelists
21st-century German short story writers
20th-century German translators
21st-century German translators